13 Years, 13 Minutes is a Polish historical film. It was released in 2006.

Romek Strzałkowski and Peter Mansfeld were young boys during the Poznań 1956 protests and Budapest 1956. 
Romek was the youngest victim.

References

2006 television films
2006 films
Polish television films
Polish historical films
2000s Polish-language films
2000s historical films